Endell Street, originally known as Belton Street, is a street in London's West End that runs from High Holborn in the north to Long Acre and Bow Street, Covent Garden, in the south. A long tall narrow building on the west side is an 1840s-built public house, the Cross Keys, Covent Garden.

Location

Endell Street is crossed only by Shorts Gardens and Shelton Street. Betterton Street intersects between these on the eastern side. The northern end of the street is in the London Borough of Camden, the south in the City of Westminster.  The street is an avenue with very tall, mature plane trees, widely spaced; it now equals the B401 (which had included Bow and Wellington Streets) and is one-way, southbound.

History
The land on which the southern part of Endell Street is built was originally owned by William Short, who leased it to Esmé Stewart, 3rd Duke of Lennox, in 1623–24. Lennox House was built on the site which eventually passed to Sir John Brownlow who began to build from 1682. Belton Street was created, named after the Brownlow's country seat in Lincolnshire, Belton House. Henry Wheatley writes that the southern end of the street from Castle Street to Short's Gardens was originally known as Old Belton Street, the northern end from Short's Gardens to St Giles, was known as New Belton Street.

In the seventeenth century, Queen Anne is supposed to have bathed in the waters from a medical spring there at a site known as Queen Anne's Bath.

The modern Endell Street was created according to the reforming plans of architect James Pennethorne.

Charles Lethbridge Kingsford states that the street was built in 1846 when Belton Street was widened and extended northwards to Broad Street (now in High Holborn). The street is believed to have been named after the Reverend James Endell Tyler, rector of St Giles in the Fields in the 1840s. The British Lying-In Hospital was relocated to a purpose-built building on Endell Street in 1849.

Listed buildings

There are eight listed buildings of the street, including:

Lavers and Barraud stained-glass studio
The Jewell and Withers Building at 22 Endell Street is a Grade II listed building. Located on the corner of Betterton Street and Endell Street, the polychrome brick and stone Gothic revival structure, cited as an early example of the style, was designed as a studio for the stained-glass firm Lavers and Barraud in 1859, and is listed together with the attached cast-iron railings. The gable window on Betterton Street has a significant contemporary stained glass window by the artist Brian Clarke. The post-modern artwork, which references the building's original function as a stained glass studio, was commissioned as part of an early 1980s refurbishment of the building. Funded by the British Crafts Council, but fabricated in Germany, it was installed in 1981, and designed to be equally visually effective by night and in daytime through its complex use of lead and varied mouth-blown glass.

Cross Keys public house
The Cross Keys public house at No.31, constructed 1848–49, is a Grade II listed building.

Latchfords Timber Yard
The nineteenth-century Latchfords Timber Yard and attached timber sheds at No.61 are Grade II listed.

Swiss Protestant Church
The Swiss Protestant Church at No.79 was designed by George Vulliamy and built 1853–4. It is also Grade II listed.

Inhabitants
The watercolour painter William Henry Hunt was born at "8 Old Belton Street" (No. 7) in 1790.

Hospitals of Endell Street

British Lying-in Hospital 

Founded in 1749, this maternity hospital was built at No.24 in 1849; it closed in 1913.

St Paul's Hospital

Founded in 1898, thus urology hospital took over the premises at No.24 after the British Lying-In Hospital closed; St Paul's Hospital closed in 1992.

Endell Street Military Hospital

During the first world war a military hospital operated from No.36, staffed entirely by women. The hospital was opened in 1915 by suffragists Dr Flora Murray and Dr Louisa Garrett Anderson and treated 24,000 patients and carried out over 7,000 operations. It closed in 1919.

Clubs

The Caravan Club

The basement of No.81 was home from July 1934 to the Caravan Club that advertised itself as "London's Greatest Bohemian Rendezvous said to be the most unconventional spot in town" which was code for being gay-friendly. The club helpfully promised "All night gaiety". It was run by Jack Rudolph Neaves, known as "Iron Foot Jack" on account of the metal leg brace he wore, and was frequented by both gay men and lesbian women. It was financed by small-time criminal Billy Reynolds.

The club came to the attention of the police almost straight away and in August local residents complained "It's absolutely a sink of iniquity." The club was raided on 25 August, with men arrested. Their trial at Bow Street Magistrates' Court caused a sensation reported in the News of the World.

The Hospital Club

The Hospital Club opened in 2003 at No.24 to serve the members of London's media and creative industries. It was on the site of the former St Paul's Hospital. It was used by the rock band Radiohead to record parts of their 2007 album In Rainbows and the 2008 live video In Rainbows – From the Basement. In 2020, the club closed permanently due to the effects of the COVID-19 pandemic and other "extenuating circumstances".

References

External links

Covent Garden
Streets in the London Borough of Camden
Endell Street, London